The Datamatic Division of Honeywell announced the H-800 electronic computer in 1958. The first installation occurred in 1960. A total of 89 were delivered. The H-800 design was part of a family of 48-bit word, three-address instruction format computers that descended from the Datamatic 1000, which was a joint Honeywell and Raytheon project started in 1955. The 1800 and 1800-II were follow-on designs to the H-800.

Data
The basic unit of data was a word of 48 bits. This could be divided in several ways:
 8 Alphanumeric characters of 6 bits each
 12 Hexadecimal or Decimal characters of 4 bits each
 16 Octal characters of 3 bits each
 An instruction with four components of 12 bits each: the operation to be performed, and  three memory addresses.

Hardware

The Honeywell 800 was a transistorized computer with core memory.  Its processor used around 6000 discrete transistors and around 30,000 solid-state diodes. 
The basic system had:
 A Central Processor with 16 controlled input/output trunks
 An Input/Output Control Center (IOCC) with control functions for:
 A card reader/punch,
 A high-speed printer
 Up to 4 magnetic tape units
 A Control Memory of 256 special registers of 16 bits each
 A Main memory containing 4 banks of 2048 words.

Extra peripherals could be added running through additional controllers with a theoretical possibility of 56 tape units.

Up to 12 more main memory banks could be added.

A random access disc system with a capacity of 800 million alphanumeric characters could be added.

Multiprogram control allowed up to 8 programs to be sharing the machine, each with its own set of 32 special registers.

A Floating-Point Unit was optionally available. The 48 bit word allowed a seven bit exponent and 40 bit mantissa. So numbers between 10−78 and 10+76 were possible and precision was 12 decimal places.  If the customer did not buy the floating point unit, then floating point commands were implemented by software simulation.

Peripheral devices included: high-density magnetic tapes, high-speed line printers, fast card and paper tape readers and punches to high-capacity random access magnetic disc memories, optical scanners, self-correcting orthoscanners and data communications devices.

Software
Available software included:
 ARGUS (Automatic Routine Generating and Updating System), an assembly language.
 FACT (Fully Automatic Compiling Technique), a business compiler.
 PERT (Program Evaluation and Review Technique), a project management system.
 COP (Computer Optimization Package), a program testing system.
 COBOL (COmmon Business Oriented Language), a compiler for the well known business programming language.
 FORTRAN (FORmula TRANslator), a compiler, runtime package, and "load and go" OS for the scientific language compiler.

References

Further reading
Jane King, William A. Shelly, "A Family History of Honeywell's Large-Scale Computer Systems," IEEE Annals of the History of Computing, vol. 19, no. 4, pp. 42–46, Oct.-Dec. 1997,

External links
 Company Sales Manual for the Honeywell 1800
  Honeywell 800 a superior scientific computer
 A Family History of Honeywell's Large-Scale Computer Systems
 Martin H. Weik, A Third Survey of Domestic Electronic Digital Computing Systems, Ballistic Research Laboratories, Report No. 1115, March 1961 (ed-thelen.org)
 Real Machines with 24-bit and 48-bit words
 www.yourdictionary.com Honeywell

Honeywell mainframe computers
Transistorized computers
48-bit computers
Computer-related introductions in 1960